Burghclere railway station (originally named Sydmonton) was a station on the Didcot, Newbury and Southampton Railway in England. It was further from the village of Burghclere than Highclere railway station but Burghclere station was relatively busy, serving the larger village of Kingsclere.

Facilities
It was furnished with the usual two platforms, station buildings (on the northbound platform) and passing loop and there were additional sidings on both sides of the line and further private sidings on a curve to the south east servicing local lime kilns. A goods shed, standard crane and cattle pen was also built next to the siding on the Northbound line.

Closure
Both the station and the railway closed in the 1960s - passenger trains were withdrawn in March 1960 and goods traffic had ceased by 1965, when the line closed completely.

Routes

References

Disused railway stations in Hampshire
Former Great Western Railway stations
Railway stations in Great Britain opened in 1885
Railway stations in Great Britain closed in 1942
Railway stations in Great Britain opened in 1943
Railway stations in Great Britain closed in 1960